Divide Township may refer to the following townships in the United States:

 Divide Township, Buffalo County, Nebraska
 Divide Township, Phelps County, Nebraska
 Divide Township, Dickey County, North Dakota